Schultz is a German surname derived from Schultheiß, meaning village headman or constable/sheriff in the medieval sense (akin to today's office of mayor). It has many variations, such as Schuldt, Schulte, Schulten, Schultes, Schultheis, Schultheiss, Schultheiß, Schultze, Schulz, Schulze and Schulzke. Adapted spellings in other languages include Shultz, Šulc and Szulc.

In Silesia, the "u" was often replaced by "o"; see also Scholz and Scholtz.

Notable people with this form of the surname include:

People

 Albert Schultz (born 1963), Canadian actor
 Alby Schultz (1939–2015), Australian politician
 Ana María Schultz (born 1935), Argentine freestyle swimmer
 Andrew Schultz (born 1960), Australian classical composer
 Arthur Schultz (1933–2011), American politician
 Barney Schultz (born 1926), American baseball player
 Bill Schultz (producer) (born 1960), American animation producer
 Bill Schultz (Fender) (1926–2006), American engineer and business executive, CEO of Fender Musical Instruments Corporation
 Bill Schultz (American football) (born 1967), American football offensive lineman
 Brenda Schultz-McCarthy (born 1970), Dutch tennis player
Brett Schultz (born 1970), South African cricketer
 Bud Schultz (born 1959), American tennis player
 Carl Schultz (disambiguation)
 Claire Kelly Schultz (1924–2015), American information scientist
 Connie Schultz (born 1957), American journalist
 Dalton Schultz (born 1996), American football player
 Daniel Schultz (1615–1683), Polish painter
 David Schultz (disambiguation), several people
 Debbie Wasserman Schultz (born 1966), American politician
 Dick Schultz (born 1929), American college sports coach and administrator
 Don Schultz (born 1936), American chess administrator
 Don E. Schultz (born 1934), American marketing expert
 Donald Schultz (born 1978), South African naturalist and entertainer, working with dangerous species   
 Dutch Schultz (1902–1935), American gangster
 Dwight Schultz (born 1947), American actor
 Ed Schultz (1954–2018), American broadcaster
 Friedrich Wilhelm Schultz (1804–1876), German pharmacist and botanist
 Graeme Schultz (born 1953), Australian Rules footballer
 Harald Schultz (1895–1957), German general during World War II
 Heinie Schultz, American football player
 Heinrich Schultz (born 1924), Estonian cultural functionary
 Helen M. Schultz (1898–1974), American bus company founder
 Helga Schultz (1941—2016), German historian
 Henry Schultz (1893–1938), American economist
 Hermann Schultz (1836–1903), German theologian
 Howard Schultz (born 1953), American businessman
 Howard Schultz (producer) (died 2014), American television producer
 Issa Schultz (born 1984), Australian quiz champion and one of the Chasers on The Chase Australia
 Ivan Schultz (1891–1974), Canadian politician
 Jaime Schultz (born 1991), American baseball player
 James Willard Schultz (1859–1947), Apukuni, American author, hunter, trader and guide
 Joe Schultz Jr. (1918–1996), American baseball player, coach, and manager
 Joe Schultz (outfielder) (1893–1941), American baseball player
 Johannes Schultz (composer) (1582–1653), German composer
 Johannes Heinrich Schultz (1884–1970), German psychiatrist
 John Schultz (disambiguation), several people
 Justin Schultz (born 1990), Canadian hockey player
 Karl Schultz (born 1937), German equestrian and Olympian
 Karl L. Schultz, US Coast Guard admiral
 Leonard Peter Schultz (1901–1986), American ichthyologist
 Keith and Kevin Schultz (born 1953), American identical twin child actors, singers and photographers
 Lachie Schultz
 Lillie Shultz (Schultz) (1904–1981), American journalist, writer, and activist
 Mark Schultz (disambiguation), several people
 Martin Schultz (disambiguation), several people
 Michael Schultz (born 1938), American director and producer
 Nick Schultz (ice hockey) (born 1982), Canadian ice hockey player
 Peter Schultz (disambiguation), several people
 Philip Schultz (born 1945), American Pulitzer Prize winning poet
 Richard Schultz (born 1926), American furniture designer
 Robert Weir Schultz (1860–1951), Scottish architect
 Ron Schultz (born 1938), politician from Florida
 Scout Schultz (1996–2017), American computer student and LGBTQ activist
 Tanja Schultz, German computer scientist
 Theodore Schultz (1902–1998), American economist
 Walter Schultz (disambiguation), several people

Fictional characters
Dr. King Schultz, from the 2012 film Django Unchained
Herman Schultz, the alias of the Marvel Comics character Shocker
Maggie Schultz, protagonist of the Beverly Cleary book Muggie Maggie
Molly Schultz, is a character from the 2013 video game Grand Theft Auto V
Nick Schultz, in the Australian TV series Blue Heelers
Schultz, from the Looney Tunes' 1943 short Daffy the Commando
Schultz, in the Battle Arena Toshinden fighting game series
Sergeant Hans Schultz, in the TV series Hogan's Heroes
Charmaine "Schultzy" Schultz, secretary on The Bob Cummings Show

See also
Schultz, West Virginia

Surnames of German origin
German-language surnames
Jewish surnames